The Ollamh Érenn or Chief Ollam of Ireland was a professional title of Gaelic Ireland.

Background

An  (literally 'most great') was a poet or bard of literature and history. Each chief or  had its own . The head ollam of a province such as Ulster would have been the head of all the ollams in that province, and would have been a social equal of the provincial king.

Over all the provincial ollams was the  who held the official post of Chief-Ollamh of Ireland or "".

The Poetic Courts
According to Daniel Corkery, in 18th century Munster, a custom similar to the Welsh Eisteddfod continued long after the destruction of the Irish clan system. In what was also both mimicry and satire of the English-dominated legal and court system, the Ollamh Érenn of a district would preside over sessions of a Cúirt, or Poetic Court. A Munster Cúirt would begin with "bailiffs" delivering often humorously worded "warrants" which summoned local Irish-language poets to a Bardic competition with the Ollamh acting as the "judge". In many cases, two Irish-language poets at the Cúirt would engage in Flyting; a mixture of debate poetry and the improvised trading of insults in verse. Also according to Corkery, much of the serious, improvised, and comic poetry in the Irish-language composed for sessions of the Munster Poetic Courts was written down by the Court "Recorders" and still survives. At the beginning of his term, the Chief-Poet of a district, similarly to an Irish clan chief, would receive a Staff of Office, which would later be handed down to his successor. This tradition continued at least until 1792.

Social status
The social status of the Ard-Ollamh was equal to the High King of Ireland. He had his own palace and a large retinue of about thirty ollamhs together with their servants. The sumptuary laws allowed him to wear six colours in his clothes, the same as the king. The ollamh had a gold bell-branch held above him, the anruth had a silver bell-branch and the other poets had a bronze bell-branch. The post was partly hereditary, as Uraicecht na Ríar ("The Primer of the Stipulations", ed. Liam Breatnach, DIAS 1987) states that a poet can only attain ollamh-rank, if he stems from a family of poets (that is, if his father and grandfather had been poets). Originally the Ollamh was appointed by the king but by the 6th century A.D. it had become an elected post which was voted for by the other ollamhs.

In Gaelic-Irish literature

An old Irish tale "Immacallam in dá Thuarad" ("The Colloquy of the Two Sages") gives an idea of the type of lofty speech of the chief ollamh.

Another old tale called "Tromdámh Guaire" ("The Heavy Company of Guaire") or "Imtheacht na Tromdhaimhe" ("The Proceedings of the Great Bardic Institution") gives a vivid description of the Chief Ollam with his entourage visiting the Irish clan chiefs.

In Lebor Gabala Erenn, an Ollamh is mentioned, named . It relates ", fierce in valour, Marked out the Scholar's Rampart, The first mighty king with grace, Who convened the Festival of Tara. Fifty years, it was tuneful fame, was he in the High Kingship over Ireland so that from him, with lucky freedom,  received its name. He died a natural death within its capital."

Duties and fees

The Irish chiefs and kings were supposed to give food and gifts to these wandering bands of ollamhs which proved a great burden to them. If they refused they were satirised. The Synod or Convention of Drumceat in 584 A.D. was called to pass new laws to keep control of the ollams. Geoffrey Keating's History of Ireland states that St Columba or Columcille interceded on their behalf as follows:

Each of them used to have a separate train of attendants according to his degree, so that nearly the third of the men of Ireland followed the bardic profession. Columcille said to the king that it was right to set aside many of the filés, as they were so numerous. The  of Ireland at that time was Eochaidh Eigeas, son of Oilill, son of Earc, and it was he who was called Dallán Forgaill, and he sent out s and set them over the provinces of Ireland, namely, Aodh Eigeas over the district of Breagh and over Meath, Urmhaol chief eigeas over the two provinces of Munster, Sanchan, son of Cuairfheartach, over the province of Connaught, and Fear Firb, son of Muireadhach, son of Mongan, in the ollamhship of Ulster; and, moreover, an ollamh in every cantred in Ireland under these high ollamhs, and they were to have free land from their territorial chiefs, as well as sanctuary, as we have said; and each of them was to get certain rewards for their poems and compositions."

List of Chief Ollamhs

Pre-historic era
 Amergin Glúingel
 Lugh Lámhfhada
 Adna mac Uthidir, c. 1st century A.D.

Early Medieval poets
 Torna Éices, fl. c. 400
 Dubhthach moccu Lughair, c. 432
 Dallán Forgaill, Chief Ollamh from c.590 to c.640
 Senchán Torpéist, Chief Ollamh from c.640 to c.649
 Máel Muire Othain, died 887
 Flann mac Lonáin, 896
 Torpaid mac Taicthech, died 913
 Óengus mac Óengusa, died 930
 Bard Boinne, died 931
 Uallach ingen Muinecháin, died 934
 Cormacan Eigeas, died 946
 Cinaedh Ua hArtagain, died 975
 Eochaidh Ua Floinn, died 984
 Urard Mac Coise, died 990

High Medieval era
 Clothna mac Aenghusa, died 1008
 Muircheartach mac Cu Ceartach Mac Liag, died 1015
 Cúán úa Lothcháin, died 1024
 Cú Mara mac Mac Liac, died 1030
 Mac Beathaidh mac Ainmire, died 1041
 Ceaunfaeladh ua Cuill, died 1048
 Flaithem Mac Mael Gaimrid, died 1058
 Cellach húa Rúanada, died 1079
 Mael Isa ua Máilgiric, died 1088
 Cú Collchaille Ua Baígilláin, died 1119
 Cú Connacht Ua Dálaigh, died 1139
 Gillamaire Ua Conallta, died 1166
 Tadhg Ua Dálaigh, died 1181
 Máel Íosa Ua Dálaigh, died 1185

Late Medieval poets
 Giolla Ernain Ó Martain, died 1218
 Gofraidh Fionn Ó Dálaigh, died 1387
 Cearbhall mac Lochlainn Ó Dálaigh, died 1405
 Sean mac Fergail Óicc Ó hUiccinn, died 1490
Paidin Ó Maol Chonaire, died 1506
Seán mac Torna Ó Maol Chonaire, fl. mid-16th century.

References

External links
 Saint Dallán Forgaill (c.560 -c.640), alias Eochaid Éices

Irish poetry
Medieval Ireland
Irish literature
Irish-language literature